is a Japanese judoka. She was born in Numazu, Shizuoka, and started judo at the age of 15. At the 1988 Seoul Olympics she won the gold medal in the Women's Middleweight (– 66 kg) category(Women's Judo as a demonstration sport). She also won silver and bronze medals at the 1987 and 1989 World Judo Championships.

References

External links
 

1967 births
Living people
Japanese female judoka